Louis II of Hesse (7 September 1438 – 8 November 1471), called Louis the Frank, was the Landgrave of Lower Hesse from 1458 - 1471.

He was the son of Louis I, Landgrave of Hesse and Anna of Saxony.  He married Mechthild, daughter of Ludwig I, Count of Württemberg-Urach in 1454.  Their children were:
 Anna [1455-1459]
 Elisabeth (died young)
 William I, Landgrave of Hesse (1466–1515)
 William II, Landgrave of Hesse (1469–1509)

He also had seven (known) illegitimate children by his mistress, Margarethe von Holzheim (born about 1443 - died after 1515):
 Anna of Hesse (born about 1460, married Heinz Missener, 23 May 1484)
 Margarethe of Hesse (born about 1460, died 1524, married Heinrich Furster, mayor of Marburg, 5 February 1486)
 Johannes of Hesse (born about 1460, murdered 11 March 1531, married Gertrude __)
 Wilhelm of Hesse (born about 1470, died 1550 in Melsungen)
 Luckel Lambrechts (born before 1471), a nun at the convent of Ahnaberg in Kassel
 Ernst of Natega, a canon in Hildesheim
 Friedrich of Hesse

The Landgraviate of Hesse had been divided by his father Louis I between Louis II and his brother Henry III into Hesse-Kassel (Lower Hesse) and Hesse-Marburg (Upper Hesse).  The brothers fought about the exact demarcation of the realm until May 1470.

Ancestry

References

External links
Ludwig II v. Hessen, Allgemeine Deutsche Biographie, Bd.: 52, Nachträge bis 1899: Linker - Paul, Leipzig, 1906
Wikisource: Allgemeine Deutsche Biographie "Ludwig II. (Landgraf von Niederhessen)"

1438 births
1471 deaths
House of Hesse
Landgraves of Hesse
Burials at St. Elizabeth's Church, Marburg